Wes Gideon (born February 28, 1937) is a retired Canadian football player who played for the Montreal Alouettes and Toronto Argonauts. He previously played at Trinity University in San Antonio.

References

Living people
1937 births
Players of American football from Houston
Players of Canadian football from Houston
American football quarterbacks
Canadian football quarterbacks
American players of Canadian football
Trinity Tigers football players
Montreal Alouettes players
Toronto Argonauts players